Nikolas Papamitrou, better known mononymously as Papamitrou or by the stage name  Nick Papz, is a music producer from Massachusetts. Papamitrou is currently the first signed producer to Meek Mill's record label: Dreamchasers.

Career
Nikolas Papamitrou aka Nick Papz, graduated Husson University with a BS degree in Communications Technology. He started a YouTube channel at the age of sixteen producing "Meek Mill Type Beats" which was getting attention and thousands of subscribers. Papamitrou started communicating with well known producers such as Sap (producer) and Jahlil Beats. He was originally discovered through Instagram by a fan tagging Meek Mill's manager on his beat video. Papamitrou got signed to Dreamchasers soon after that. Papamitrou became notable after releasing his beat tapes "Apollo" and "Cuatro" on SoundCloud and MyMixtapez, which set him off with the help of Meek Mill promoting him.

In February 2017, Papamitrou released two major songs on Don Q's project "Corner Stories" named "Don Vito," & "It's All Love" with a feature from Dave East. He then released a song with Meek Mill on the Meekend II mixtape called, "Young Nxxx Dreams," (ft. YFN Lucci & Barcelini). On July 21, 2017, Meek Mill released the Wins & Losses album worldwide with three major songs produced by Papamitrou. He produced the intro called "Wins & Losses", "Connect The Dots" (ft. Yo Gotti & Rick Ross) and "These Scars"(ft. Future & Guordan Banks). The Wins and Losses Album debuted at No. 3 on the Billboard 200 Albums Chart with 102,000 units in album sales on its first week. The album remained at No. 3 for the second week. Papamitrou explained how he got involved with Meek Mill and the Dreamchasers in an interview with My Mixtapez

Papamitrou also works with many other artists such as Dave East (Album Karma2) Don Q on his song Trap Phone and mixtape Corner Stories.

In November 2018, Meek Mill released his new album Championships that made #1 on the Billboard 200. Papamitrou produced four songs on that album of which three made it to the Billboard Hot 100. The album was also nominated for Best Rap Album at the 2020 Grammys.

In 2021 Nik was part of Meek's new album: "Expensive Pain" and also continue to expand and being part of other artists' projects such as Lil Baby and Snoop Dog.

Mixtapes 
Historic (2013)
Trapademikz (2016)
Apollo (2016)
Cuatro (2017)
7 Series ft. Jahlil Beats
Corner Stories

Production discography

References 

1995 births
Living people
American hip hop record producers
Husson University alumni
American people of Greek descent